The Iver Huitfeldt class is a three-ship class of air defence frigates that entered service with the Royal Danish Navy in 2012 and 2013.

Description
The class is built on the experience gained from the Absalon-class frigates, and by reusing the basic hull design of the Absalon class, the Royal Danish Navy has been able to construct the Iver Huitfeldt class considerably cheaper than comparable ships. 

The frigates are compatible with the Royal Danish Navy's StanFlex modular mission payload system used in the Absalons, and they are designed with slots for six modules. Each of the four StanFlex positions on the missile deck is able to accommodate either the Mark 141 8-cell Harpoon launcher module or the 12-cell Mark 56 ESSM VLS. Peter Willemoes passed the British Flag Officer Sea Training test in 2015.

While the Absalon class ships are primarily designed for command, support, and ASW roles, with a large ro-ro deck, the three new Iver Huitfeldt-class frigates are equipped for an air defence role with Standard Missiles, as well as the potential to use Tomahawk cruise missiles, a first for the Royal Danish Navy.

The ships were constructed in blocks in Estonia and Lithuania. These blocks were then towed to the Odense Steel Shipyard where they were assembled.

Anti-air warfare

Most of the weapons for the three ships were reused from the previous s and the s. Other components were also reused to keep the cost at a minimum.

These ships share their anti-air warfare suite with the Royal Netherlands Navy's  frigates and the German Navy's  frigates. The sensors of this suite include the long range surveillance radar SMART-L (passive electronically scanned array) and the multi-function radar APAR active electronically scanned array. The SMART-L and APAR are highly complementary in the sense that SMART-L is an L band radar, providing very long range surveillance, while APAR is an I band radar, providing precise target tracking, a highly capable horizon search capability, and missile guidance using the Interrupted Continuous Wave Illumination (ICWI) technique, thus allowing guidance of 32 semi-active radar homing missiles in flight simultaneously, including 16 in the terminal guidance phase. The primary anti-air weapons are the medium-range Evolved Sea Sparrow missile and the area defence SM-2 IIIA. The Mk 41 Vertical Launch System is used to house and launch these missiles. Depending on the number of Harpoon launchers installed, up to 24 Evolved Sea Sparrow missile and 32 SM-2 IIIA or SM-6 may be carried.

List of ships

Export bids

Australia
The builder's successor, OMT, suggested the type for the Procurement programme of the Royal Australian Navy's frigates, but built in Australia and modified for anti-submarine warfare. (along with the Royal New Zealand Navy as they currently operate modified s similar to those of the Royal Australian Navy).
However, OMT was not among the three warship designers shortlisted  by Australia for the SEA 5000 frigate program in April 2016.

Canada
The Iver Huitfeldt-class frigate was a contender in the Canadian Single Class Surface Combatant Project. However, it has been claimed that due to concerns over the fairness of the bidding process, two European shipbuilders, possibly Germany's ThyssenKrupp Marine Systems and Odense Maritime Technology, declined to submit bids.

United Kingdom
In late May 2018 the consortium of Babcock International, BMT Group and Thales Group announced the "Arrowhead 140" design, based on the hull of the Iver Huitfeldt-class frigates, for the Royal Navy Type 31e frigate programme. It was announced on 12 September 2019 that the Arrowhead 140 design had been selected for the Type 31 frigate.

Indonesia
In March 2019 a variant of Denmark's Iver Huitfeldt class emerged as a front-runner for the Indonesian Navy's  two-frigate acquisition programme according to Jane's. The Indonesian Navy expected to purchase two Iver Huitfeldt-class frigates with a budget plan of US$ 720 million for its MEF Phase 3 in 2020–2024. Indonesian officials and Ministry of Defense officials held multiple meetings about the ships. By 14 March 2019 there were advanced discussion between the Indonesian Ministry of Defense and Odense Maritime Technology about the technical issues and potential cooperation. Denmark offered a scheme of "transfer of technology" (ToT) to Indonesia, such as modular frigate building designed by BUMN PT PAL.

In February 2020, a defense delegation from Indonesia visited Denmark, and toured Niels Juel. According to Indonesian media, the deputy of the Indonesian Ministry of Defense Sakti Wahyu Trenggono said in March that Indonesia's PT PAL was tasked to develop a design for two ships over five years, for Rp1.1 trillion (or USD720 million) in collaboration with Denmark, for the Indonesian Navy. On 30 April, representatives from the Indonesian Ministry of Defense, PT PAL shipbuilders and PT Sinar Kokoh Persada, an Indonesian agent for the Danish Odense Maritime Technology (OMT) company, had agreed to an opening contract for the procurement of the Danish frigate. Points in the contract include workshare arrangements that will be made after the effective (actual) contract can be realized. On 16 September 2021, Indonesia signed a contract with Babcock for the purchase of the Type 31 frigate design license, which based on the Iver Huitfeldt design, in order to construct 2 frigates locally in Indonesia.

See also
 List of active Royal Danish Navy ships
 List of naval ship classes in service

Similar ships
 , a Spanish frigate design adopted by the Australian, Norwegian and Spanish navies.
 Type 26 frigate, a British design adopted by the Royal Navy, Australian and Canadian navies.
  and  stealth frigates of the Indian Navy
 MKS 180 frigate German Navy frigate 
 FREMM multipurpose frigate, French/Italian collaboration
 Arrowhead 140 Inspiration class

References

External links

 Royal Danish Navy Official Home Page on New Frigates @ Danish Defence Homepage

 
Frigate classes
Stealth ships